The Ionia Sentinel-Standard is a newspaper published in Ionia, Michigan. It is owned by Gannett.

The newspaper covers Ionia County including the cities of Ionia, Belding and Portland, and the villages of Lake Odessa, Lyons, Muir, Hubbardston, Palo, Pewamo, Orleans, Clarksville and Saranac.

The Ionia Daily Sentinel-Standard was created in 1919 through the merger of the Ionia Daily Sentinel and The Ionia Daily Standard. The Ionia Standard had begun as a weekly newspaper in 1873; the Sentinel name dates back to the Ionia County Sentinel weekly, established in 1866.

References

External links 
 
 GateHouse Media

Newspapers published in Michigan
Ionia County, Michigan
Newspapers established in 1866
Gannett publications
1866 establishments in Michigan